Martín Belforti Rodríguez (born 4 July 1981) is an Argentine former professional footballer who played as a midfielder.

Club career
Born in Buenos Aires, Belforti played in the Argentine Primera División with Argentinos Juniors, also representing in his country Defensores de Belgrano and Estudiantes de Buenos Aires. After a spell in Italy at Brera Calcio in amateur football he moved to Spain in 2006, where he spent the vast majority of his remaining career, exclusively in the lower leagues.

Personal life
Belforti's twin brother, José, was also a footballer. A defender, he too played several seasons in Spain.

References

External links

1981 births
Living people
Argentine twins
Twin sportspeople
Argentine footballers
Footballers from Buenos Aires
Association football midfielders
Argentine Primera División players
Argentinos Juniors footballers
Defensores de Belgrano footballers
Estudiantes de Buenos Aires footballers
Segunda División B players
Tercera División players
Divisiones Regionales de Fútbol players
UD Melilla footballers
CF Villanovense players
AD Cerro de Reyes players
CD Roquetas footballers
Arandina CF players
Deportivo Rayo Cantabria players
Lucena CF players
Bolivian Primera División players
C.D. Jorge Wilstermann players
Gibraltar Premier Division players
Europa F.C. players
Argentine expatriate footballers
Expatriate footballers in Italy
Expatriate footballers in Spain
Expatriate footballers in Bolivia
Expatriate footballers in Gibraltar
Argentine expatriate sportspeople in Italy
Argentine expatriate sportspeople in Spain
Argentine expatriate sportspeople in Bolivia
Argentine expatriate sportspeople in Gibraltar